Dowlatabad (also Romanized as Dowlatābād; also known as Daulatābād, Dowlatābād-e Karīm, and Dowlatābād-e ‘Olyā) is a village in Chenarud-e Jonubi Rural District, Chenarud District, Chadegan County, Isfahan Province, Iran. At the 2006 census, its population was 100, in 16 families.

References 

Populated places in Chadegan County